In Greek mythology, Arisbe (Ancient Greek: Ἀρίσβη) or Arisba may refer to the following women:

 Arisbe, daughter of Merops of Percote, a seer. In a non-Homeric story, she married Priam, later king of Troy, and bore him a son named Aesacus.  Priam subsequently divorced her in favor of Hecuba, daughter of King Dymas of Phrygia.  Arisbe then married Hyrtacus, to whom she bore a son named Asius. Ephorus wrote of Arisbe as the first wife of Paris. Otherwise, the mother of Aesacus was the naiad Alexirrhoe, daughter of the river Granicus.
 Arisbe, also called Bateia, a princess as the daughter of King Teucer of Crete or of King Macareus of Lesbos. She was married to Dardanus, son of Zeus and Electra. There was a town named Arisbe in the Troad (in the northwestern part of Anatolia) and another on the island of Lesbos. Arisbe, then, may be an eponym. As daughter of Macareus, Arisbe was the sister of Methymna, Mytilene, Agamede, Antissa, Issa, Cydrolaus, Neandrus, Leucippus and Eresus.

Other use 

 Arisbe is also the name of the residence of American philosopher Charles Sanders Peirce.

Notes

References 

 Apollodorus, The Library with an English Translation by Sir James George Frazer, F.B.A., F.R.S. in 2 Volumes, Cambridge, MA, Harvard University Press; London, William Heinemann Ltd. 1921. . Online version at the Perseus Digital Library. Greek text available from the same website.
 Diodorus Siculus, The Library of History translated by Charles Henry Oldfather. Twelve volumes. Loeb Classical Library. Cambridge, Massachusetts: Harvard University Press; London: William Heinemann, Ltd. 1989. Vol. 3. Books 4.59–8. Online version at Bill Thayer's Web Site
Diodorus Siculus, Bibliotheca Historica. Vol 1-2. Immanel Bekker. Ludwig Dindorf. Friedrich Vogel. in aedibus B. G. Teubneri. Leipzig. 1888-1890. Greek text available at the Perseus Digital Library.
Lycophron, The Alexandra  translated by Alexander William Mair. Loeb Classical Library Volume 129. London: William Heinemann, 1921. Online version at the Topos Text Project.
Lycophron, Alexandra translated by A.W. Mair. London: William Heinemann; New York: G.P. Putnam's Sons. 1921. Greek text available at the Perseus Digital Library.
Publius Ovidius Naso, Metamorphoses translated by Brookes More (1859-1942). Boston, Cornhill Publishing Co. 1922. Online version at the Perseus Digital Library.
Publius Ovidius Naso, Metamorphoses. Hugo Magnus. Gotha (Germany). Friedr. Andr. Perthes. 1892. Latin text available at the Perseus Digital Library.
Stephanus of Byzantium, Stephani Byzantii Ethnicorum quae supersunt, edited by August Meineike (1790-1870), published 1849. A few entries from this important ancient handbook of place names have been translated by Brady Kiesling. Online version at the Topos Text Project.

Princesses in Greek mythology
Queens in Greek mythology
Trojans
Priam